The Hemmerleinhalle was a music venue with a capacity for 3500 people, located in Neunkirchen am Brand, Germany. Many well-known artists performed at the venue such as Kiss, Bon Jovi, Black Sabbath, Slayer, Metallica, Iron Maiden in 1980, 1982, 2x in 1983, Rush, AC/DC, The Kinks, Whitesnake, Ozzy Osbourne, Frank Zappa and Thin Lizzy.
It opened in 1973 and closed in 1988.

References

Music venues in Germany
Former music venues in Germany
Forchheim (district)
Event venues established in 1973
1973 establishments in West Germany
1988 disestablishments in West Germany